Duff Peak is a peak 1 nautical mile (2 km) east-southeast of Sentinel Peak, rising to  at the head of Hughes Glacier in the Kukri Hills, Victoria Land. It was named in 1992 by the Advisory Committee on Antarctic Names after Roger S. Duff (died 1978), for 30 years director of the Canterbury Museum, Christchurch, New Zealand. To celebrate the Museum's centenary in 1970, a Hundredth Anniversary Wing was planned which would incorporate a National Antarctic Exhibition, Research and Reference Center. A landmark of Dr. Duff's administration, the Antarctic wing was opened on March 4, 1977.

References 

Mountains of Victoria Land
McMurdo Dry Valleys